Murad Shamanovich Tagilov (born 27 January 1990) is a Russian former footballer.

Club career
He made his Russian Premier League debut for FC Terek Grozny on 21 November 2009 in a game against FC Kuban Krasnodar.

External links
  Profile by Footballfacts

1990 births
Living people
Russian footballers
Russia youth international footballers
Association football defenders
FC Akhmat Grozny players
Russian Premier League players
FC Khimik Dzerzhinsk players